Clare Drake Arena is a 3,009-seat multi-purpose arena in Edmonton, Alberta, Canada. It is home to the University of Alberta Golden Bears and Pandas  ice hockey teams and was named after former University of Alberta Golden Bears hockey coach, Clare Drake, who led the Golden Bears to 697 career wins.

See also

List of Commonwealth Games venues

References

Indoor ice hockey venues in Canada
Indoor arenas in Alberta
Sports venues in Edmonton
University of Alberta buildings
University sports venues in Canada
1978 Commonwealth Games venues
1959 establishments in Alberta
Sports venues completed in 1959
University and college buildings completed in 1959